Silver Sage may refer to:

 Salvia argentea, a biennial or short-lived perennial plant
 Silver Sage, Fort Worth, Texas